Garzón may refer to:

Geographic places:

Garzón (Colombia), a town and municipality in the Huila Department, Colombia
 Roman Catholic Diocese of Garzón, Colombia
Garzón, Uruguay, a village in Maldonado department
 Arroyo Garzón and Laguna Garzón, a stream and a lagoon in the same area
 Laguna Garzón Bridge, a circular bridge in that area

People:

Alberto Garzón, Spanish economist and party leader of Izquierda Unida
Baltasar Garzón, Spanish judge
Eugenio Garzón, Uruguayan politician and military man
Jaime Garzón, Colombian journalist, comedian, and political satirist
Gustavo Garzón, Argentine film and television actor
Luis Eduardo Garzón, former Mayor of Bogotá, Colombia
Nelly Garzón Alarcón (1932-2019), Colombian nurse, teacher

See also 
Garçon (disambiguation)
Garson (disambiguation)